The Military Horseman Identification Badge recognizes United States Army soldiers who complete the nine-week Basic Horsemanship Course and serve as a lead rider on the Caisson team within the 3rd U.S. Infantry Regiment (The Old Guard). The badge was first awarded on September 29, 2017, to soldiers during a ceremony held at Joint Base Myer-Henderson Hall, Virginia.

The Military Horseman Identification Badge is authorized by the Commander, 3rd U.S. Infantry Regiment (The Old Guard) as a permanent part of the uniform for personnel who meet the following criteria:
a. Successfully complete the nine week Basic Horsemanship Course. 
b. Complete 100 Armed Forces Full Honors Funerals in Arlington National Cemetery. 
c. Served honorably for a minimum of nine months, which need not be continuous, while assigned as a member of the U.S. Army Caisson Platoon, 3rd U.S. Infantry Regiment (The Old Guard). 
d. Be recommended by the Commander, 1st Battalion, 3rd U.S. Infantry Regiment (The Old Guard). 

Temporary wear of the Military Horseman Identification Badge may be authorized prior to serving the required nine months with the recommendation of the Commander,
1st Battalion, 3rd U.S. Infantry Regiment (The Old Guard) and approval by Commander, 
3rd U.S. Infantry Regiment (The Old Guard) provided all other criteria have been met. 

Soldiers reassigned from authorized positions within the U.S. Army Caisson Platoon prior to completion of nine months' service may be considered for permanent award on a case-by-case basis by the Commander, 3rd U.S. Infantry Regiment (The Old Guard).

The Military Horseman Identification Badge is only awarded for those soldiers serving in the Caisson Platoon of the 3rd U.S. Infantry Regiment. It will not be awarded to soldiers serving in other positions with horse detachments or platoons.
The Military Horseman Identification Badge will be worn after the Guard, Tomb of the Unknown Soldier Identification Badge and before the Drill Sergeant Identification Badge. Additional guidance on wear of the identification badges can be found in DA Pam 670-1, paragraph 20-17a.

References

External links

Awards and decorations of the United States Army
United States military badges